Alfred Robert Dunbar (18 June 1888 – c. 1954) was a rugby union player who represented Australia.

Dunbar, a wing, was born in Glebe, New South Wales and claimed a total of 4 international rugby caps for Australia.

References

Australian rugby union players
Australia international rugby union players
1888 births
Year of death missing
Rugby union players from Sydney
Rugby union wings